Kasmir or Kashmir is the northernmost geographical region of the Indian subcontinent claimed by China, India, and Pakistan.

Kasmir may also refer to:
 Kasmir (singer) (born 1985), Finnish urban soul music artist 
 Jan Rose Kasmir (born 1950), former American high-school student featured in an anti-war photograph
 Kašmir, a poetry collection by Aleš Šteger

See also
 Kaśmir Śaivism or Kashmir Shaivism, a school of Śaivism consisting of Trika and its philosophical articulation Pratyabhijña